Paingkyon is a town in Hlaingbwe Township, Hpa-an District, in the Kayin State of Myanmar.

References

External links
"Paingkyon Map — Satellite Images of Paingkyon" at Maplandia

Populated places in Kayin State